Saraca celebica is a species of plant in the family Fabaceae. It is a tree found only in Sulawesi in Indonesia.

References

celebica
Endemic flora of Sulawesi
Trees of Sulawesi
Near threatened plants
Taxonomy articles created by Polbot